Nakhon Nayok Provincial Administrative Organization Stadium or Nakhon Nayok Province Stadium is a multi-purpose stadium in Nakhon Nayok Province, Thailand. It is currently used mostly for football matches and is the home stadium of Nakhon Nayok F.C.  The stadium holds 2,406 people.

Football venues in Thailand
Multi-purpose stadiums in Thailand
Buildings and structures in Nakhon Nayok province
Sport in Nakhon Nayok province